Malcolm Bulner (born 9 July 1944) is a Sri Lankan former welterweight boxer.

Bulner was educated at St. Sylvester's College, which is located in his home town, Kandy.

He represented Ceylon at the 1962 British Empire and Commonwealth Games and at the 1964 Summer Olympics in Tokyo.

Bulner later went onto represent Australia in international boxing competitions just after participating in the 1964 Summer Olympics representing Ceylon. He was coached by Derrick Raymond, who was a notable boxing coach in his times.

Presently, Bulner serves as one of the world class boxing judges (referee) and has officiated in several boxing competitions held in Australia.

1964 Olympic results
Below is the record of Malcolm Bulner, a welterweight boxer  from Ceylon who competed at the 1964 Tokyo Olympics:

 Round of 32: lost to Bohumil Nemecek (Czechoslovakia) by decision, 0-5

See also 
 List of St. Sylvester's College alumni

References

External links
 
 
 
 Profile at boxrec.com - judge
 Profile at boxrec.com - boxer

1944 births
Living people
Sri Lankan male boxers
Olympic boxers of Sri Lanka
Boxers at the 1964 Summer Olympics
Boxers at the 1962 British Empire and Commonwealth Games
Commonwealth Games competitors for Sri Lanka
Alumni of St. Sylvester's College
Welterweight boxers
Australian people of Sri Lankan descent